Anastasia Pavlyuchenkova was the defending champion, but chose to compete in Linz instead.

Dayana Yastremska won her first WTA Tour title, defeating Wang Qiang in the final, 6–2, 6–1.

Seeds

Draw

Finals

Top half

Bottom half

Qualifying

Seeds

Qualifiers

Lucky losers

Draw

First qualifier

Second qualifier

Third qualifier

Fourth qualifier

Fifth qualifier

Sixth qualifier

External links
Main Draw
Qualifying Draw

Hong Kong Tennis Open
Hong Kong Open (tennis)
2018 in Hong Kong sport